Suzanne Todd (born June 1, 1965) is an American film and television producer, and the owner of the film production company Team Todd.

Career
Team Todd produced the 2012 romantic comedy Celeste and Jesse Forever, starring Rashida Jones and Andy Samberg, which made its debut at the 2012 Sundance Film Festival where it was acquired by Sony Pictures Classics. This was Team Todd's second time at Sundance. They also produced Galt Niederhoffer's directorial debut The Romantics, which premiered at the 2010 Sundance Film Festival.

Team Todd produced Disney's Alice in Wonderland (2010), which grossed over $1 billion at the worldwide box office and won two Academy Awards—for Best Achievement in Art Direction and for Costume Design. Alice in Wonderland was also Golden Globe nominated for Best Motion Picture Comedy or Musical, won the Teen Choice Award for Choice Movie: Fight, won the Saturn Award for Best Fantasy Film, and was nominated for several other Teen Choice, MTV and People's Choice Awards.

Since early 2010, Todd works as a creative and business consultant for Activision/Blizzard.

In addition, Team Todd produced the musical Across The Universe, directed by Julie Taymor and starring Evan Rachel Wood. It was nominated for a 2008 Golden Globe Award for Best Picture and Academy Award nominated in the Best Costume category.

Todd's independent film, Memento, garnered filmmaker Christopher Nolan MTV's Best New Filmmaker Award in 2002 as well as the Independent Spirit Award for Best Feature.

Grossing over half a billion dollars worldwide, Team Todd's Austin Powers trilogy is the most successful comedy franchise in New Line Cinema history. Released in 1997, Austin Powers: International Man of Mystery, starring Mike Myers and Elizabeth Hurley quickly became an audience favorite, and went on to gross $67 million worldwide. The 1999 follow-up Austin Powers: The Spy Who Shagged Me, again starring Mike Myers, this time with Heather Graham, grossed $310 million worldwide and won a Grammy Award for Best Song Written for a Motion Picture, two MTV Movie Awards and a Teen Choice Award. It was nominated for a slew of other awards including an Academy Award for Best Makeup, a Golden Globe for Best Original Song, a Grammy for Best Soundtrack Album and a MTV Award for Best Movie. The third installment, Austin Powers in Goldmember, starring Mike Myers with Beyoncé Knowles, grossed $289 million worldwide and won a Kids' Choice Award for Favorite Movie, the MTV Award for Best Comedic Performance and a BMI Film Music Award. It was also nominated for a Saturn Award in addition to several other MTV, Teen Choice and Black Reel Awards.

Team Todd's other credits include The Accidental Husband, Prime, Must Love Dogs, and Boiler Room, the gritty Wall Street drama starring Giovanni Ribisi and Ben Affleck, for which Todd, her sister Jennifer, and director Ben Younger, were nominated for Best First Feature at the 2001 Independent Spirit Awards. In 1999, Todd executive produced HBO's If These Walls Could Talk 2, starring Vanessa redgrave, Ellen DeGeneres and Sharon Stone, for which she received a 2000 Emmy Award nomination for Outstanding Made for Television Movie and a 2001 PGA Golden Laurel Award nomination for Producer of the Year in Longform TV. Vanessa Redgrave won every major acting award for her role in this film, including the Emmy for Outstanding Supporting Actress in a Miniseries or Movie, the Golden Globe for Best Supporting Actress – Series, Miniseries or Television Film, and the SAG Award for Outstanding Performance by a Female Actor in a Television Movie or Miniseries.

Prior to forming Team Todd, Todd partnered with Demi Moore to create their production company, Moving Pictures. During their five-year partnership, Todd produced G.I. Jane for director Ridley Scott at Disney, which starred Moore, as well as Now and Then for New Line Cinema, also starring Moore with Rosie O'Donnell, Melanie Griffith, Rita Wilson, Christina Ricci and Thora Birch. Their TV movie If These Walls Could Talk, starring Moore, Cher, Sissy Spacek and Rita Wilson, was at that time the highest rated movie in HBO history, and earned Todd a Golden Globe nomination and two Emmy Award nominations for Best Picture Made for Television as well as the prestigious Governor's Award.

Personal life
Todd is a Film Production graduate at USC's School of Cinematic Arts. She is involved in several charitable causes including St. Joseph Center, The Children's Institute, The Alliance for Children's Rights, Variety, the Children's Charity, and the Zimmer Children's Museum. She mentors aspiring filmmakers through the USC Stark Mentorship Program and the Producers Guild of America. She is also a member of Academy of Motion Picture Arts and Sciences, Academy of Television Arts and Sciences, the Producers Guild of America and DGA.

Todd is also an avid poker player, and won the 9th Annual Saban Poker Tournament, winning a seat in the 2012 World Series of Poker main event in Las Vegas. While a student at USC, Todd was an undefeated champion for a week on The $100,000 Pyramid.

Filmography

Film

Miscellaneous crew

Television

Awards 
Todd's films have been honored by the Academy Awards, Golden Globes and Emmys, as well as Cosmo's Fun Fearless Female Award, the GLAAD media award, Saturn Awards, MTV Movie Awards, and a People's Choice Award.

References

External links
 
 https://web.archive.org/web/20120118023159/http://www.moviemaker.com/producing/article/jennifer_and_suzanne_todds_sister_act_20071118

1965 births
Living people
Film producers from California
Actresses from Los Angeles
University of Southern California alumni
American women film producers
People from Sherman Oaks, Los Angeles
21st-century American women